The North Kara basin is a sedimentary basin, a part of the Arctic shelf of Russia, associated with the Kara Sea. It is  separated from the South Kara basin by the North Siberian sill (along Novaya Zemlya-Taimyr Peninsula). From the North it is bounded by the Urvantsev Trough.

References

Geography of Russia
Nenets Autonomous Okrug
Kara Sea